Copper(I) hydroxide is the hydroxide of the metal copper with the chemical formula of CuOH. It is a mild, highly unstable alkali. The color of pure CuOH is yellow or orange-yellow, but it usually appears rather dark red because of impurities. It is extremely easily oxidized even at room temperature. It is useful for some industrial processes and in preventing condensation of formaldehyde. It is also an important reactant and intermediate for several important products including Cu2O3 and Cu(OH)2. Additionally, it can act as a catalyst in the synthesis pyrimidopyrrolidone derivatives.

Preparation 

The dissociation of Cu(OH)2− leads to the formation of CuOH.

Cu(OH)2- <=> CuOH + OH-

The dissociation energy required for this reaction is 62 ± 3 kcal/mol.

Another method is by the double displacement of CuCl and NaOH:
 CuCl + NaOH <=> NaCl + CuOH v 

Notably, this method is rarely used because the CuOH produced will gradually dehydrate and eventually turn into Cu2O.

Structure 
CuOH can be a linear molecule of the symmetry group C∞v. For the linear structure, the bond distance of the Cu-O bond has been found to be 1.788 Å and the distance of the O-H bond has been found to be 0.952 Å. The CuOH bond angle was measured as 180°.

There is also the possibility of a formed CuOH with the point group Cs. This has been found to have increased stability compared to the linear geometry. In this case, the bond distance of the Cu-O bond was 1.818 Å and the bond distance of the O-H bond was 0.960 Å. The bond angle for this geometry was 131.9°. The compound is highly ionic in character, which is why this angle is not exactly 120°.

Spectroscopic characterization 
CuOH has been characterized spectroscopically using intracavity laser spectroscopy, single vibronic level emission, and microwave spectroscopic detection.

Reactions 
Similar to iron(II) hydroxide , copper(I) hydroxide can easily oxidise into copper(II) hydroxide:

 4CuOH + 2H2O + O2 <=> 4Cu(OH)2 

Cu(OH)2 is used as a fungicide for agriculture, as a mordant, as a source for copper salts, and for the manufacturing of rayon.

Catalytic activity 
CuOH can act as a catalyst. It has been found to be useful in the reaction of heterocyclic ketene aminals (an important building block) with diazoesters. This reaction is used to synthesize pyrimidopyrrolidone derivatives with high yields and mild reaction conditions needed. As a catalyst in these reactions, it is used with potassium tert-butoxide and argon with tert-butyl hydroperoxide and dichloroethane. 25 examples of these reactions were successfully performed. Chemicals in the pyrrolidone family have been useful for drug development, including pharmaceuticals for the neuroprotection after strokes and in anti-seizure medications. Although these are psychoactive drugs, they tend to have fewer side effects than their counterparts. The mechanisms by which these drugs work have yet to be established.

Applications 
CuOH is an important intermediate in the formation of copper(I) oxide (Cu2O). The Cu2O compound has versatile applications such as for use in solar cells, for the oxidation of fiberglass, and for use in lithium ion batteries. It has even been shown to have a useful application in the development of DNA biosensors for the hepatitis B virus. Notably, it has been found that both CuOH and Cu(OH)2 must be simultaneously present for the synthesis of Cu2O.

Copper (I) vs other oxidation states 
Cu+ and Cu2+ are the most common oxidation states of copper although Cu3+ and Cu4+ have also been reported. Cu2+ tends to form stable compounds whereas Cu+ usually forms unstable compounds such as CuOH. One exception to this is Cu2O, which is much more stable. However, aside from this compound, compounds containing Cu+ have not been studied as extensively as Cu2+ compounds due to their relative instability. This includes CuOH.

References

Copper(I) compounds
Hydroxides